Naguib Mahfouz Abdelaziz Ibrahim Ahmed Al-Basha (11 December 1911 – 30 August 2006) was an Egyptian writer who won the 1988 Nobel Prize in Literature. Mahfouz is regarded as one of the first contemporary writers in the Arabic literature, along with Taha Hussein, to explore themes of existentialism. He is the only Egyptian to win the Nobel Prize in Literature. He published 35 novels, over 350 short stories, 26 screenplays, hundreds of op-ed columns for Egyptian newspapers, and seven plays over a 70-year career, from the 1930s until 2004. All of his novels take place in Egypt, and always mentions the lane, which equals the world. His most famous works include The Cairo Trilogy and Children of Gebelawi. Many of Mahfouz's works have been made into Egyptian and foreign films; no Arab writer exceeds Mahfouz in number of works that have been adapted for cinema and television. While Mahfouz's literature is classified as realist literature, existential themes appear in it.

Early life and education
Mahfouz was born in a lower middle-class Muslim Egyptian family in Old Cairo in 1911. The first part of his compound given name was chosen in appreciation of the well-known obstetrician, Naguib Pasha Mahfouz, who oversaw his difficult birth. Mahfouz was the seventh and the youngest child, with four brothers and two sisters, all of them much older than him. (Experientially, he grew up an "only child.") The family lived in two popular districts of Cairo: first, in the Bayt al-Qadi neighborhood in the Gamaleya quarter in the old city, from where they moved in 1924 to Abbaseya, then a new Cairo suburb north of the old city, locations that would provide the backdrop for many of Mahfouz's later writings. His father, Abdel-Aziz Ibrahim, whom Mahfouz described as having been "old-fashioned", was a civil servant, and Mahfouz eventually followed in his footsteps in 1934. Mahfouz's mother, Fatimah, was the daughter of Mustafa Qasheesha, an Al-Azhar sheikh, and although illiterate herself, took the boy Mahfouz on numerous excursions to cultural locations such as the Egyptian Museum and the Pyramids.

The Mahfouz family were devout Muslims and Mahfouz had a strict Islamic upbringing. In an interview, he elaborated on the stern religious climate at home during his childhood. He stated that "You would never have thought that an artist would emerge from that family."

The Egyptian Revolution of 1919 had a strong effect on Mahfouz, although he was at the time only seven years old. From the window he saw British soldiers firing at the demonstrators in an effort to disperse them. According to Mahfouz, "You could say ... that the one thing which most shook the security of my childhood was the 1919 revolution", he later said.

In his early years, Mahfouz read extensively and was influenced by Hafiz Najib, Taha Hussein and Salama Moussa, the Fabian intellectual.

After completing his secondary education, Mahfouz was admitted in 1930 to the Egyptian University (now Cairo University), where he studied philosophy, graduating in 1934. By 1936, having spent a year working on an M.A. in philosophy, he decided to discontinue his studies and become a professional writer. He published his first work in Al Majalla Al Jadida, a magazine started by Salama Musa in 1929. Mahfouz then worked as a journalist for Arrissalah, and contributed short stories to Al-Hilal and Al-Ahram.

Civil service 
After receiving his bachelor's degree in Philosophy from Cairo University in 1934, Mahfouz joined the Egyptian civil service, where he continued to work in various positions and ministries until retirement in 1971. He served first as a clerk at Cairo University, then, in 1938, in the Ministry of Islamic Endowments (Awqaf) as parliamentary secretary to the Minister of Islamic Endowments. In 1945, he requested a transfer to the al-Ghuri Mausoleum library, where he interviewed residents of his childhood neighborhood as part of the "Good Loans Project." In the 1950s, he worked as Director of Censorship in the Bureau of Arts, as Director of the Foundation for the Support of the Cinema, and finally as a consultant to the Ministry of Culture.

Writing career 

Mahfouz published 34 novels, over 350 short stories, dozens of screenplays, and five plays over a 70-year career. Possibly his most famous work, The Cairo Trilogy, depicts the lives of three generations of different families in Cairo from World War I until after the 1952 military coup that overthrew King Farouk. He was a board member of the publisher Dar el-Ma'aref. Many of his novels were serialized in Al-Ahram, and his writings also appeared in his weekly column, "Point of View". Before the Nobel Prize only a few of his novels had appeared in the West.

Writing style and themes 
Most of Mahfouz's early works were set in Cairo. Abath Al-Aqdar (Mockery of the Fates) (1939), Rhadopis (1943), and Kifah Tibah (The Struggle of Thebes) (1944) were historical novels written as part of a larger unfulfilled 30-novel project. Inspired by Sir Walter Scott (1771–1832), Mahfouz planned to cover the entire history of Egypt in a series of books. However, following the third volume, his interest shifted to current settings and issues, as well as the psychological impact of social change on ordinary people.

Mahfouz's prose is characterised by the blunt expression of his ideas. His written works cover a broad range of topics, including the controversial and taboo such as socialism, homosexuality, and God. Writing about some of these subjects was prohibited in Egypt.

Mahfouz's works often deal with Egypt's development during the 20th century, and combined intellectual and cultural influences from both East and West. His own exposure to foreign literature began in his youth with the enthusiastic consumption of Western detective stories, Russian classics, and modernist writers as Marcel Proust, Franz Kafka and James Joyce. Mahfouz's stories are almost always set in the heavily populated urban quarters of Cairo, where his characters, usually ordinary people, try to cope with the modernization of society and the temptations of Western values.

Mahfouz's central work in the 1950s was the Cairo Trilogy, which he completed before the July Revolution. The novels were titled with the street names Palace Walk, Palace of Desire, and Sugar Street. Mahfouz set the story in the parts of Cairo where he grew up. The novels depict the life of the patriarch el-Sayyed Ahmed Abdel Gawad and his family over three generations, from World War I to the 1950s, when King Farouk I was overthrown. Mahfouz stopped writing for some years after finishing the trilogy.

Disappointed in the Nasser régime, which had overthrown the monarchy in 1952, he started publishing again in 1959, now prolifically pouring out novels, short stories, journalism, memoirs, essays, and screenplays. He stated in a 1998 interview that he "long felt that Nasser was one of the greatest political leaders in modern history. I only began to fully appreciate him after he nationalized the Suez Canal." His  non-fiction, including his journalism and essays and his writing on literature and philosophy, were published in four volumes from 2016.

His 1966 novel Tharthara Fawq Al-Nīl (Adrift on the Nile) is one of his most popular works. It was later made into a film called Chitchat on the Nile during the régime of Anwar al-Sadat. The story criticizes the decadence of Egyptian society during the Nasser era. It was banned by Sadat to avoid provoking Egyptians who still loved former president Nasser. Copies of the banned book were hard to find prior to the late 1990s.

The Children of Gebelawi (1959, also known as Children of the Alley) one of Mahfouz's best known works, portrayed the patriarch Gebelaawi and his children, average Egyptians living the lives of Cain and Abel, Moses, Jesus, and Mohammed. Gebelawi builds a mansion in an oasis in the middle of a barren desert; his estate becomes the scene of a family feud that continues for generations. "Whenever someone is depressed, suffering or humiliated, he points to the mansion at the top of the alley at the end opening out to the desert, and says sadly, 'That is our ancestor's house, we are all his children, and we have a right to his property. Why are we starving? What have we done?'" The book was banned throughout the Arab world except in Lebanon until 2006 when it was first published in Egypt. The work was prohibited because of its alleged blasphemy through the allegorical portrayal of God and the monotheistic Abrahamic faiths of Judaism, Christianity, and Islam.

In the 1960s, Mahfouz further developed the theme that humanity is moving further away from God in his existentialist novels. In The Thief and the Dogs (1961) he depicted the fate of a Marxist thief who has been released from prison and plans revenge.

In the 1960s and 1970s Mahfouz began to construct his novels more freely and often used interior monologues. In Miramar (1967) he employed a form of multiple First-person narratives. Four narrators, among them a Socialist and a Nasserite opportunist, represent different political views. In the center of the story is an attractive servant girl. In Arabian Nights and Days (1979) and in The Journey of Ibn Fatouma (1983) he drew on traditional Arabic narratives as subtexts. Akhenaten: Dweller in Truth (1985) deals with conflict between old and new religious truths.

Many of his novels were first published in serialized form, including Children of Gebelawi and Midaq Alley which was also adapted into a Mexican film starring Salma Hayek called El callejón de los milagros.

Political influence 
Most of Mahfouz's writings deal mainly with politics, a fact he acknowledged: "In all my writings, you will find politics. You may find a story which ignores love or any other subject, but not politics; it is the very axis of our thinking".

He espoused Egyptian nationalism in many of his works, and expressed sympathies for the post-World-War-era Wafd Party. He was also attracted to socialist and democratic ideals early in his youth. The influence of socialist ideals is strongly reflected in his first two novels, Al-Khalili and New Cairo, as well as many of his later works. Parallel to his sympathy for socialism and democracy was his antipathy towards Islamic extremism.

In his youth, Mahfouz had personally known Sayyid Qutb when Qutb was showing a greater interest in literary criticism than in Islamic fundamentalism; Qutb later became a significant influence on the Muslim Brotherhood. In the mid-1940s, Qutb was one of the first critics to recognize Mahfouz's talent, and by the 1960s, near the end of Qutb's life, Mahfouz even visited him in the hospital. But later, in the semi-autobiographical novel Mirrors, Mahfouz drew a negative portrait of Qutb. He was disillusioned with the 1952 revolution and by Egypt's defeat in the 1967 Six-Day War. He had supported the principles of the revolution, but became disenchanted, saying that the practices failed to live up to the original ideals.

Mahfouz's writing influenced a new generation of Egyptian lawyers, including Nabil Mounir and Reda Aslan.

Reception 
Mahfouz's translated works received praise from American critics:

"The alleys, the houses, the palaces and mosques and the people who live among them are evoked as vividly in Mahfouz's work as the streets of London were conjured by Dickens."
—Newsweek

"Throughout Naguib Mahfouz's fiction there is a pervasive sense of metaphor, of a literary artist who is using his fiction to speak directly and unequivocally to the condition of his country. His work is imbued with love for Egypt and its people, but it is also utterly honest and unsentimental."
—Washington Post

"Mahfouz's work is freshly nuanced and hauntingly lyrical. The Nobel Prize acknowledges the universal significance of [his] fiction."
—Los Angeles Times

"Mr. Mahfouz embodied the essence of what makes the bruising, raucous, chaotic human anthill of Cairo possible."
—The Economist

Nobel Prize for Literature 
Mahfouz was awarded the 1988 Nobel Prize in Literature, the only Arab writer to have won the award. Shortly after winning the prize Mahfouz was quoted as saying: 

The Swedish letter to Mahfouz praised his "rich and complex work":

Because Mahfouz found traveling to Sweden difficult at his age, he did not attend the award ceremony.

Political involvement 
Mahfouz did not shrink from controversy outside of his work. As a consequence of his support for Sadat's Camp David peace treaty with Israel in 1978, his books were banned in many Arab countries until after he won the Nobel Prize. Like many Egyptian writers and intellectuals, Mahfouz was on an Islamic fundamentalist "death list".

He defended British-Indian writer Salman Rushdie after Ayatollah Ruhollah Khomeini condemned Rushdie to death in a 1989 fatwa, but also criticized Rushdie's novel The Satanic Verses as "insulting" to Islam. Mahfouz believed in freedom of expression, and, although he did not personally agree with Rushdie's work, he spoke out against the fatwa condemning him to death for it.

In 1989, after Ayatollah Khomeini's fatwa calling for Rushdie and his publishers to be killed, Mahfouz called Khomeini a terrorist. Shortly after, Mahfouz joined 80 other intellectuals in declaring that "no blasphemy harms Islam and Muslims so much as the call for murdering a writer."

Assassination attempt and aftermath 
The publication of The Satanic Verses revived the controversy surrounding Mahfouz's novel Children of Gebelawi. Death threats against Mahfouz followed, including one from the "blind sheikh," Egyptian-born Omar Abdul-Rahman.  Mahfouz was given police protection, but in 1994 an extremist succeeded in attacking the 82-year-old novelist by stabbing him in the neck outside his Cairo home.

He survived, permanently affected by damage to nerves of his right upper limb. After the incident, Mahfouz was unable to write for more than a few minutes a day and consequently produced fewer and fewer works. Subsequently, he lived under constant bodyguard protection. Finally, in the beginning of 2006, the novel was published in Egypt with a preface written by Ahmad Kamal Aboul-Magd. After the threats, Mahfouz stayed in Cairo with his lawyer, Nabil Mounir Habib. Mahfouz and Mounir would spend most of their time in Mounir's office; Mahfouz used Mounir's library as a reference for most of his books. Mahfouz stayed with Mounir until his death.

Personal life
Mahfouz remained a bachelor until age 43 because he believed that, with its numerous restrictions and limitations, marriage would hamper his literary future. "I was afraid of marriage . . . especially when I saw how busy my brothers and sisters were with social events because of it. This one went to visit people, that one invited people. I had the impression that married life would take up all my time. I saw myself drowning in visits and parties. No freedom."

However, in 1954, he quietly married a Coptic Orthodox woman from Alexandria, Atiyyatallah Ibrahim, with whom he had two daughters, Fatima and Umm Kalthum. The couple initially lived on a houseboat in the Agouza section of Cairo on the west bank of the Nile, then moved to an apartment along the river in the same area. Mahfouz avoided public exposure, especially inquiries into his private life, which might have become, as he put it, "a silly topic in journals and radio programs."

Mahfouz distinctly did not like to travel. Belgrade was one of the few cities to which he gladly went and he expressed great respect for Serbia.

Works 
 A translation into Arabic of James Baikie's Ancient Egypt (1932) مصر القديمة
 Whisper of Madness (1938) همس الجنون 
 Mockery of the Fates (1939) عبث الأقدار. His first full-length novel, translated title in English Khufu's Wisdom.
 Rhadopis of Nubia (1943) رادوبيس
 The Struggle of Thebes (1944) كفاح طيبة
 Cairo Modern (1945) القاهرة الجديدة
 Khan al-Khalili (1945) خان الخليلي
 Midaq Alley (1947) زقاق المدق
 The Mirage (1948) السراب
 The Beginning and the End (1949) بداية ونهاية
 Palace Walk (1956) بين القصرين (Cairo Trilogy, Part 1)
 Palace of Desire (1957) قصر الشوق (Cairo Trilogy, Part 2)
 Sugar Street (1957) السكرية (Cairo Trilogy, Part 3)
 Children of Gebelawi (1959) أولاد حارتنا
 The Thief and the Dogs (1961) اللص والكلاب
 Autumn Quail (1962) السمان والخريف
 God's World (1962) دنيا الله
 Zaabalawi (1963) زعبلاوي
 The Search (1964) الطريق
 The Beggar (1965) الشحاذ
 Adrift on the Nile (1966) ثرثرة فوق النيل
 Miramar (1967) ميرامار
 The Pub of the Black Cat (1969) خمارة القط الأسود
 A Story Without a Beginning or an Ending (1971) حكاية بلا بداية ولا نهاية
 The Honeymoon (1971) شهر العسل
 Mirrors (1972) المرايا
 Love in the Rain (1973) الحب تحت المطر
 The Crime (1973) الجريمة
 Karnak Café (1974) الكرنك
 Stories from Our Neighbourhood (حكايات حارتنا (1975
 Respected Sir (1975) حضرة المحترم
 The Harafish (1977) ملحمة الحرافيش
 Love above the Pyramid Plateau  (1979) الحب فوق هضبة الهرم
 The Devil Preaches (1979) الشيطان يعظ 
 Arabian Nights and Days (1979) ليالي ألف ليلة
 Love and the Veil (1980) عصر الحب
 Wedding Song (novel) (1981)  (also known as Joys of the Dome) أفراح القبة
I Saw, in a Dream (1982), including the short story "Qismati and Nasibi" (My Fate and My Destiny)
 One Hour Remains (1982; also published in translation as The Final Hour) الباقي من الزمن ساعة
 The Journey of Ibn Fattouma (1983) رحلة ابن فطومة
 Akhenaten, Dweller in Truth (1985) العائش فى الحقيقة
 The Day the Leader was Killed (1985) يوم مقتل الزعيم
 The Hunger (Al-Go'a) (1986) الجوع
 Please and Your Kindness (1986) من فضلك وإحسانك
 Morning and Evening Talk (1987) حديث الصباح والمساء
 The False Dawn (1988) الفجر الكاذب
 The Coffeehouse (1988)
 Echoes of an Autobiography (1994) أصداء السيرة الذاتية
 Echoes of Forgetness صدى النسيان (1999)
 Dreams of the Rehabilitation Period (2004) أحلام فترة النقاهة
  
 The Seventh Heaven (2005)
 Dreams of Departure (2007; posthumous translation)
 Before the Throne (2009; posthumous translation) أمام العرش
 In the Time of Love (2010; posthumous translation)
 Heart of the Night (2011; posthumous translation)
 The Quarter (short stories, 2019; posthumous translation)

Honours

Bibliography

See also
 List of Egyptian authors
 List of African writers
 The Beginning and the End

References

External links

Naguib Mahfouz on his English publisher's website
Naguib Mahfouz – The Son of Two Civilizations at Nobel Prize website
 
 
BBC Obituary
The 100th Anniversary of the Birth of Naguib Mahfouz at Qantara.de
Mahfouz Centennial Celebrations 2011 at The American University in Cairo Press

1911 births
2006 deaths
Egyptian novelists
Egyptian male short story writers
Egyptian short story writers
Egyptian nationalists
Egyptian Nobel laureates
Egyptian socialists
Nobel laureates in Literature
Cairo University alumni
Writers from Cairo
20th-century novelists
Egyptian male writers
20th-century short story writers
Commandeurs of the Ordre des Arts et des Lettres
Muslim socialists